Michael A. Walsh (born October 23, 1949) is an American music critic, author, screenwriter, media critic, historian, and cultural-political consultant.

Career 
Walsh began his journalism career as a reporter and later music critic in 1972 at the Rochester Democrat and Chronicle in upstate New York.  He was named chief classical music critic of the San Francisco Examiner in November 1977, where in 1980 he won an ASCAP-Deems Taylor Award for music criticism.  He became music critic of Time magazine in the spring of 1981, where his cover story subjects included James Levine, Vladimir Horowitz and Andrew Lloyd Webber. He was also a foreign correspondent for the magazine from 1989 to 1996, based in Munich, Germany, from which city he covered first-hand the fall of the Berlin Wall in 1989 and the collapse of Soviet communism in 1991.

Beginning in February, 2007 and running until 2015, Walsh wrote for National Review both under his own name and using a fictional persona named David Kahane, the name of which "... is borrowed from a screenwriter character in (the movie) The Player." This persona has evolved into one of "... a Hollywood liberal who has a habit of sharing way too much about the rules by which they live to a conservative audience."

In January, 2010, in collaboration with Andrew Breitbart, he launched BigJournalism.com, devoted to media commentary and criticism. From December 3, 2010, to the summer of 2013 he contributed a weekly opinion column for the New York Post, and in late June 2012 became a featured columnist at PJ Media. He now contributes weekly to The Epoch Times as well as to the Post as an occasional Sunday columnist, and has been a featured weekly columnist at American Greatness. His work has appeared in such publications as The New York Times, Vanity Fair, GQ, Playboy, Smithsonian Magazine, and Connoisseur; in Europe, he has been published in Transatlantik, Die Woche, and the British edition of Esquire. His literary works have been translated into more than twenty languages, including German, Russian, Polish, Hungarian, Japanese, Chinese, and Portuguese.

His most recent book, Last Stands, sold out on Amazon the day it was published and remains on multiple bestseller lists.

Bibliography

Non-fiction
 Carnegie Hall: The First One Hundred Years (Harry N. Abrams, 1987)
 Who's Afraid of Classical Music (Fireside Books, 1989)
 Andrew Lloyd Webber: His Life and Works (Abrams, 1989, updated 1997)
 Who's Afraid of Opera? (1994)
 So When Does the Fat Lady Sing? (Amadeus, 2008).
 Rules for Radical Conservatives (as David Kahane; Ballantine, 2010)
 The People v. the Democratic Party (Encounter Broadside, 2012)
 The Devil's Pleasure Palace (Encounter Books, 2015)
 The Fiery Angel (Encounter Books, 2018)
 Last Stands (St. Martin's Press, Dec. 2020)

Novels
 Exchange Alley (1997), a Book-of-the-Month Club alternate selection upon publication that has since become a cult novel
 As Time Goes By (sequel to the film Casablanca, 1998)
 And All the Saints (2003), a fictionalized autobiography of Owney Madden's life that was a 2004 American Book Awards winner.

Espionage thrillers
 Hostile Intent, featuring the character of "Devlin", a top-secret operative of the Central Security Service, was published in September 2009 by Pinnacle. It reached No. 1 on the Amazon Kindle bestseller list upon its release, and twice appeared on the New York Times'''s extended bestseller list in October of that year.
 A sequel, Early Warning, was published in September 2010.
 The third book in the series, Shock Warning, was published in late September, 2011, and two other installments are scheduled.

FilmCadet Kelly, a 2002 Disney Channel Original Movie (co-written with Gail Parent) starring Hilary Duff was, until High School Musical, the highest-rated Disney Channel movie in history. He also wrote and produced the 1995 documentary Placido Domingo: A Musical Life for PBS, and wrote the narration for the 1999 video version of Andrew Lloyd Webber and Tim Rice's musical, Joseph and the Amazing Technicolor Dreamcoat.

Other
A lifetime member of the Writers Guild of America, Walsh has written Hard Headed Woman, a biopic of the rockabilly singer Wanda Jackson, for LD Entertainment, and 25/7 for Disney. Scripts in development include How High the Moon, about the lives of Ella Fitzgerald and Billie Holiday; Hound and Horn, set in 1940s Marseilles; and The Harp, a feature film/television series set in rural 19th-century Ireland. His Cold War script, Charlie'' (Mikael Håfström, director), is currently in the financing and casting stage.

Personal life
He currently serves on the Advisory Board of the Wende Museum in Los Angeles. His principal residences are in rural Connecticut and in County Clare, Ireland.

References

External links 

1949 births
20th-century American male writers
20th-century American non-fiction writers
21st-century American writers
American Book Award winners
American male journalists
American male novelists
American male screenwriters
American media critics
American music critics
American spy fiction writers
Boston University faculty
Breitbart News people
Classical music critics
Eastman School of Music alumni
Living people
National Review people
New York Post people
Novelists from Massachusetts
Novelists from New York (state)
San Francisco Examiner people
Screenwriters from California
Screenwriters from Massachusetts
Screenwriters from New York (state)
Time (magazine) people